John M. Sapien (born June 4, 1970) is an American politician who served as a member of the New Mexico Senate from 2009 to 2021.

Early life and education 
Born in Albuquerque, New Mexico, Sapien graduated Bernalillo High School in 1988. He earned a Bachelor of Business Administration from the University of New Mexico in 1992 .

Career 
Sapien has been the chairman of the Senate Education Committee since 2013 and is chairman of the Legislative Education Study Committee. Sapien interned for Senator Jeff Bingaman. Sapien's father, Bill, served as a Sandoval County commissioner.

References

External links
 Senator John M. Sapien - (D) at New Mexico Legislature
 
 Biography at Ballotpedia

1970 births
Living people
Democratic Party New Mexico state senators
21st-century American politicians